Andreas Dober (born 31 March 1986) is an Austrian footballer who plays for Rapid Wien II as a defender.

Club career
Born in Vienna, Dober came through the youth ranks at Rapid Wien and made his professional debut in the 2004–2005 season only to be loaned out to SC Rheindorf Altach in the second half of that season. He established himself as a regular starter for Rapid on his return in the 2005/2006 season.

International career
He made his debut for Austria in an October 2005 World Cup qualification match against England and has collected 3 caps so far in total.

Honours
Austrian Football Bundesliga (1):
 2007-08
Austrian Football First League (1):
2015-16

References

External links
 
 
 

1986 births
Living people
Association football defenders
Austrian footballers
Austria youth international footballers
Austria under-21 international footballers
Austria international footballers
SK Rapid Wien players
SC Rheindorf Altach players
First Vienna FC players
SKN St. Pölten players
Austrian Football Bundesliga players